Ascher is a German surname. Notable people with the surname include:

 Daisy Ascher (1944–2003), Mexican photographer
 Fritz Ascher (1893–1970), German artist 
 John Ascher, entomologist 
 Joseph Ascher (1829–1869), Dutch composer and court pianist to Eugénie de Montijo
 Kate Ascher, author and executive vice president of the New York City Economic Development Corporation
 Kenneth Lee Ascher (born 1944), American jazz pianist and composer
 Leo Ascher (1880–1942), Jewish composer
 Marcia Ascher (1935–2013), American mathematician
 Mathias Ascher (pseudonym of Nathan Birnbaum) (1864–1937), Austrian Jewish journalist and philosopher
 Saul Ascher (1767–1822), Jewish narrative writer and publicist
 Tova Ascher, Israeli female film editor and director
 William Ascher (born 1947), American professor of public policy
 Zika Ascher (1910–1992), Czech refugee textile designer and manufacturer in London and Paris

See also
 Asher (disambiguation)

German-language surnames
Occupational surnames